Kristin Jonsson (March 15, 1974)  a former Swedish footballer. Jonsson was a member of the Swedish national team that reached the semi finals of UEFA Women's Euro 1997.

References

1974 births
Swedish women's footballers
Sweden women's international footballers
Women's association football forwards
Sunnanå SK players
Living people
Damallsvenskan players